The M By Montcalm Shoreditch Tech City is a contemporary-style, 18-storey hotel in the Shoreditch area of the London Borough of Hackney, London. It is part of The Montcalm group of hotels.

The Shoreditch Tech City contains 269 rooms, meeting rooms, a spa and gym, two bars and two restaurants.

Background

The Shoreditch Tech City opened in May 2015 at Silicon Roundabout on City Road (on the corner between Britannia Walk and Provost Street). A new-built tower, designed by London-based architect firm Squire and Partners, the hotel is effectively in the shape of an elongated diamond, with its point jutting into City Road. This façade was inspired by the diagonal stripe-based abstract painting Nataraja (1993) by modern artist Bridget Riley.

References

External links
 M By Montcalm Shoreditch Tech City official website

Hotels in London
Hotel chains in the United Kingdom
Buildings and structures in the London Borough of Hackney
Hotels established in 2015
2015 establishments in England